One Arrow 95-1A is an Indian reserve of the One Arrow First Nation in Saskatchewan. It is 27 kilometres northeast of Hague. In the 2016 Canadian Census, it recorded a population of 10 living in 2 of its 2 total private dwellings.

References

Indian reserves in Saskatchewan
Division No. 15, Saskatchewan